Kwak or KWAK may refer to:

Kwak (surname), a Korean surname (郭, 霍)
KWAK (AM), a radio station (1240 AM) licensed to serve Stuttgart, Arkansas, United States
KWAK-FM, a radio station (105.5 FM), licensed to serve Stuttgart, Arkansas
KWAK-LP, a low-power radio station (102.5 FM) licensed to serve San Xavier, Arizona, United States
Pauwel Kwak, a Belgian beer
Alfred J. Kwak, a cartoon television series